Nalawa F.C. was a Fijian football team playing in the second division of the Fiji Football Association competitions. It is based in Vunikavikaloa in Ra, which is a situated on the island of Viti Levu.

Their uniform includes black shirt with white trim.

History 
The Nalawa Soccer Association was formed in 1978, under the presidency of Ram Vinod.

See also 
 Fiji Football Association

References

Bibliography 
 M. Prasad, Sixty Years of Soccer in Fiji 1938 – 1998: The Official History of the Fiji Football Association, Fiji Football Association, Suva, 1998.

Football clubs in Fiji
1978 establishments in Fiji